Brownsville is a borough in Fayette County, Pennsylvania, United States, first settled in 1785 as the site of a trading post a few years after the defeat of the Iroquois enabled a post-Revolutionary war resumption of westward migration. The Trading Post soon became a tavern and Inn, and was soon receiving emigrants heading west, as it was located above the cut bank overlooking the first ford that could be reached to those descending from the Allegheny Mountains.

As a community, the town is the central population center for a number of outlying hamlets geographically tied to the town for the same reasons they were founded nearby—Western Pennsylvania has far more hills and steep slopes than flats or gentle sloping terrains suitable for settlement. This keeps Brownsville at the nexus of the transportation infrastructure which grew up during its history. While no longer a passenger depot, the town and cross-River West Brownsville share an important railway bridge, creating a balloon loop allowing the turning of complete coal trains. Newest is the limited access toll road PA Route 43, which connects the town to strategic points and southern Pittsburgh at Clairton. River hugging PA Route 88, connects to towns up and down the Mon Valley and the historic National Road (now US Route 40) reached East Saint Louis, Illinois and connected the town to the immigrants arriving in the port of Baltimore traveling west on the Cumberland Turnpike and the National Road.

From its founding, well into the 19th century, as the first reachable population center west of the Alleghenies barrier range on the Mississippi watershed, the borough quickly grew into an industrial center, market town, transportation hub, outfitting center, and river boat-building powerhouse. It was a gateway destination for emigrants heading west to the Ohio Country when a trading post, and the new United States' Northwest Territory and their "legal successors" for travelers heading westwards on the various Emigrant Trails both to the Near West and later Far West from its founding until well into the 1850s. As outfitting center, the borough provided the markets for the small-scale industries in the surrounding counties—as well as for Maryland shipping goods over the pass by mule-train via the Cumberland Narrows toll-route.

Brownsville became a major center for building steamboats through the 19th century, producing 3,000 boats by 1888.

The borough developed in the late 19th century as a railroad yard and coking center, with other industries related to the rise of steel in the Pittsburgh area. It reached a peak of population of more than 8,000 in 1940. Postwar development took place in suburbs, as was typical of the time. The restructuring of the railroad and steel industries caused a severe loss of jobs and population in Brownsville, beginning in the 1970s. The borough had a population of 2,331 as of the 2010 census.

History
In pre-Columbian times, the right bank Monongahela held several mounds where iron rich red stone predominated, now believed to have been constructed by a branch of the Mound Builders cultures, but were believed by colonials to have been forts—leading to the area near the river crossing being called Redstone Old Fort in various colonial government records, and later Fort Burd, when an arms cache was built there.  By the time the region first became known to Dutch colonists and traders and the French in the 1640s, the lands were largely unoccupied, but under the management of one tribe or shared by several groups of Iroquoian peoples, likely the Erie people, or Wenro people and possibly shared with Seneca, the Shawnee people and the Susquehannocks. With all the rivers and streams tributary to the Monongahela, Youghiogheny, Allegheny Rivers, there is little known about the region's precise role in the Beaver Wars of the 17th century, but when French and Dutch and Swedish fur traders penetrated to the Greater Ohio Basin in the 1640s-1650s, the one thing that seemed clear to those observers was the lands later termed the Ohio Country seemed empty and unpopulated.
 
When in the 17th century, the occasional Englishman, as provincial Virginian or Marylanders generated their observations the emptiness of the region was confirmed. Before the 1750s, the area was 'colonized' by weakened remnant tribes such as the Delaware, the few Erie and the Susquehannock survivors (climbing the gaps of the Allegheny) the Iroquois allowed to move there as tributary peoples.  These migrations occurred over the 70–80 years preliminary to the French and Indian War in the 1750s, where today's historians usually report the lands were long held as 'hunting territories' of the powerful Five Nations of the Iroquois Confederacy. During the Revolution, the Iroquois were divided whether to back the Colonies or the mother country, and mostly did neither, attempting to stay neutral. Nonetheless in 1778, agitated by British Officers lobbying for frontier attacks, mixed parties of Tories (Loyalists) and Iroquois committed atrocities in 1778, so Washington sent the Sullivan Expedition in 1779, which broke the power of the Iroquois—re-opened the Ohio Country to homesteader settlement. As a river crossing, the closest to the pass that reached the Monongahela, the town would see a lot of boots of settlers passing by.

Because colonial settlers believed that earthwork mounds were a prehistoric fortification, they called the settlement Redstone Old Fort; later in the 1760s–70s, it eventually became known as "Redstone Fort" or by the mid-1760s, "Fort Burd" named after the officer who commanded the British fort constructed in 1759. The fort was constructed during the French and Indian War (Seven Years' War) on the bluff above the river near a prehistoric earthwork mound that was also the site of historic Native American burial grounds.

In 1774, a force from the Colony of Virginia garrisoned and occupied the stockade during Lord Dunmore's War against the Mingo and Shawnee peoples. It commanded the important strategic river ford of Nemacolin's Trail, the western path to the summit; this was later improved and called "Burd's Road". It was an alternative route down to the Monongahela River valley from Braddock's Road, which George Washington helped to build. Washington came to own vast portions of the lands on the west bank of the Monongahela; the Pennsylvania legislature named Washington County, after him and territorially, the largest county of the state.  
 
Entrepreneur Thomas Brown acquired the western lands in what became Fayette County, Pennsylvania, around the end of the American Revolution. He realized the opening of the pass through the Cumberland Narrows, and war's end made the land at the western tip of Fayette County a natural springboard for settlers traveling to points west, such as Kentucky, Tennessee and Ohio. Many travelers used the Ohio River and its tributary, the Monongahela. Eventually the settlement became known as "Brownsville" after him. In the 1780s, Jacob Bowman bought the land on which he built Nemacolin Castle; he had a trading post and provided services and supplies to emigrant settlers.

Redstone Old Fort is mentioned in C. M. Ewing's The Causes of that so called Whiskey Insurrection of 1794 (1930) as the site of a July 27, 1791, meeting in "Opposition to the Whiskey Excise Tax," during the Whiskey Rebellion. It was the first meeting of that illegal frontier insurrection.

Brownsville was positioned at the western end of the primitive road network (Braddock's Road to Burd's Road via the Cumberland Narrows pass) that eventually became chartered as the Cumberland toll road and later, after the Federal Government appropriated funds for its first ever road project, became known as the National Pike and well after tolls were removed, became the present-day U.S. Route 40, one of the original federal highways.
 
As an embarkation point for travelers to the west, Redstone/Brownsville, blessed by several nearby wide & deep water minor river tributaries could support building slips, soon became a center in the 19th century for the construction of riverine watercraft, initially keelboats and Flatboats, but later steamboats large and small.  The entire region sprouted small industries utilizing local coal and Iron deposits feeding iron fittings and products to outfitting settlers about to embark on the river.  After 1845, its boats were used even by those intending to later take the Santa Fe Trail or Oregon Trail, as floating on a poleboat by river to St. Louis or other ports on the Mississippi River was generally safer, easier and far faster than overland travel of the time.

A large flatboat building industry developed at Brownsville exploiting the flats across the river in present-day West Brownsville to erect building slips. This was followed by its rapid entry into the building of steamboats: local craftsmen built the Enterprise in 1814, the first steamboat powerful enough to travel down the Mississippi River to New Orleans and back. Earlier boats did not have enough power to go upstream against the river's current. Brownsville developed as an early center of the steamboat-building industry in the 19th century. The Monongahela converges with the Ohio River at Pittsburgh and allowed for quick traveling to the western frontier. From 1811 to 1888, boatyards produced more than 3,000 steamboats. Steamboats were gradually supplanted in the passenger carrying trade after the American Civil War as the construction of railroad networks surged, but concurrently grew important locally on the Ohio River and tributaries as tugs delivering barge loads of minerals to the burgeoning steel industries growing up along the watershed from the 1850s. Steamboat propulsion would not be replaced by diesel powered commercial tugs until the technology matured in the mid-20th century.

The first all-cast iron arch bridge constructed in the United States was built in Brownsville to carry the National Pike (at the time a wagon road) across Dunlap's Creek. See Dunlap's Creek Bridge.

After the 1853 completion of the Baltimore & Ohio Railroad to the Ohio, outfitting emigrant wagon trains in Brownsville declined in importance.
 
Yet the rise of the steel industry in the Pittsburgh area led Brownsville to develop as a railroad yard and coking center, generally integrated into other towns within the valley, so Brownsville and West Brownsville were tied to regional operations and while no one yard had space enough to be large, each township along the river shared resources and functioned as an elongated yard system. With its new role as Railroad center and coking center together with the decline of outfitting, the town gradually lost its diverse mix of businesses, but nonetheless, generally prospered during the early 20th century through the 1960s. Brownsville tightened its belt during the Great Depression, but the local economy resumed growth with the increased demand for steel during and after World War II, when many infrastructure projects hatched the improved and rerouted U.S. Route 40 over the new high level bridge, clearing up a perennial traffic congestion problem.
 
In 1940, 8,015 people lived in Brownsville. Its postwar growth led to the development of cross-county-line suburbs such as Malden, Lowhill, and Denbeau Heights (Denbow Heights), which were mainly bedroom communities within commuting distance. In the mid-1970s after the OPEC Oil Embargo of 1973–74 triggered a recession, with the restructuring of the steel industry and loss of industrial jobs, Brownsville suffered a severe decline, along with much of the Rust Belt. Generally, the region has declined in population and vitality ever since.
 
By 2000, the population was 2,804, as younger people had moved away to areas with more jobs. In 2011, Brownsville has a handful of buildings that are condemned or boarded up. Abandoned buildings include the Union Station of the railroad, several banks, and other businesses. The sidewalks around the town are still intact and usable.

Brownsville attracted major entertainers in the early postwar years, who also were performing in nearby Pittsburgh. According to Mike Evans in his book Ray Charles: The Birth of Soul (2007), the singer developed his hit "What'd I Say" as part of an after-show jam in Brownsville in December 1958.

Lester Ward was elected mayor in 2009.

In 2019, Browsville served as the primary filming location for the coming-of-age comedy-drama web television series I Am Not Okay with This, which became available on Netflix in 2020.

Geography
Brownsville is located at  (40.020026, -79.889536), situated on the east (convex) side of a broad sweeping westward bend in the northerly flowing Monongahela River on the northwestern edge of Fayette County. The river's action eroded the steep-sided sandstone hills, creating shelf-like benches and connecting sloped terrain that gave the borough lowland areas adjacent to or otherwise accessible to the river shores. Much of the borough's residential buildings are built above the elevation of the business district.

The opposite river shore of Washington County is, uncharacteristically for the region, shaped even lower to the water surface and is generally flatter. A small hamlet called West Brownsville developed on the western shore, with a current population of 992. Historically the area was a natural river crossing, and it was the site of development of a ferry, boat building and a bridge to carry roads. When the nascent United States government appropriated funds for its first road building project, in 1811 Brownsville was chosen as an early intermediate target destination along the new National Road. Until a bridge was built across the river, Brownsville was the western terminus.

Redstone Creek is a local tributary stream of the Monongahela River, entering just north of Brownsville. Its color came from the ferrous sandstone that lined its bed, as well as the sandstone heights near the Old Forts. The creek was wide enough for settlers to build, dock and outfit numerous flatboats, keelboats, and other river craft. Its builders made thousands of pole boats that moved the emigrants who settled the vast Northwest Territory. Later Brownsville industry built the first steamboats on the inland rivers, and many hundreds afterwards.

Colonists used the term "Old Forts" for the mounds and earthworks created by the prehistoric Mound Builders cultures. Archeologists and anthropologists have since determined that many prehistoric Native American cultures in North America along the Mississippi River and its tributaries built massive earthworks for ceremonial, burial and religious purposes over a period of thousands of years prior to European encounter. For instance, the Mississippian culture, reaching a peak about 1150 CE at Cahokia in present-day Illinois, had sites throughout the Mississippi and Ohio river valleys, and into the Southeast. Archaeological research is ongoing working to tie the local mounds and others regionally close to a particular era and culture.

Demographics

As of the census of 2000, there were 2,804 people, 1,238 households, and 716 families residing in the borough. The population density was 2,796.6 people per square mile (1,082.6/km2). There were 1,550 housing units at an average density of 1,545.9 per square mile (598.5/km2). The racial makeup of the borough was 85.95% White, 11.41% African American, 0.11% Native American, 0.07% Asian, 0.21% from other races, and 2.25% from two or more races. Hispanic or Latino of any race were 0.82% of the population.

There were 1,238 households, out of which 24.7% had children under the age of 18 living with them, 36.2% were married couples living together, 17.0% had a female householder with no husband present, and 42.1% were non-families. 38.0% of all households were made up of individuals, and 20.5% had someone living alone who was 65 years of age or older. The average household size was 2.24 and the average family size was 2.97.

In the borough the population was spread out, with 23.2% under the age of 18, 9.0% from 18 to 24, 25.6% from 25 to 44, 21.1% from 45 to 64, and 21.1% who were 65 years of age or older. The median age was 40 years. For every 100 females, there were 83.1 males. For every 100 females age 18 and over, there were 77.7 males.

The median income for a household in the borough was $18,559, and the median income for a family was $32,662. Males had a median income of $31,591 versus $21,830 for females. The per capita income for the borough was $13,404. About 28.8% of families and 34.3% of the population were below the poverty line, including 51.2% of those under age 18 and 17.9% of those age 65 or over.

Features
Dunlap's Creek Bridge (1839) under part of the level stretch of Market Street, carrying old U.S. Route 40 over Dunlap's Creek in Brownsville, is the nation's oldest cast iron bridge in existence. (Capt. Richard Delafield, engineer; John Snowdon and John Herbertson, foundrymen)

The Flatiron Building (c. 1830), constructed as a business building in thriving 19th-century Brownsville, is one of the oldest, most intact iron commercial structures west of the Allegheny Mountains.  Over its history, it has housed private commercial entities as well as public, such as a post office.  It is the unofficial "prototype" for the flatiron buildings seen across the United States.  The most notable is the Flatiron Building in Market Square in New York City.

After nearly being demolished, the building was saved by the Brownsville Area Revitalization Corporation (BARC).  Throughout two decades, via private and public grants, BARC has restored the Flatiron Building as an historic asset to Brownsville.  The Flatiron Building Heritage Center, located within the building at 69 Market Street, holds artifacts from Brownsville's heyday, as well as displays about the community's important coal and coke heritage.  The Frank L. Melega Art Museum, located with the Heritage Center, displays many examples of this local southwestern Pennsylvanian's famous artwork, depicting the coal and coke era in the surrounding tri-state region.

In addition to the Dunlap's Creek Bridge, Brownsville is the location of other properties on the National Register of Historic Places.  They are Bowman's Castle (Nemacolin Castle), Brownsville Bridge, St. Peter's Church, and Thomas H. Thompson House.  There are two national historic districts: the Brownsville Commercial Historic District and Brownsville Northside Historic District.

Education
The Brownsville Area School District serves Brownsville as well as several nearby communities.  Schools within the district are:

 Brownsville Area High School (9–12)
 Brownsville Area Middle School (6–8)
 Brownsville Area Elementary School (k-5)

Infrastructure

Transportation

Brownsville is located on the banks of the Monongahela River, a major tributary of the Ohio River, one of North America's most important waterways. The Monongahela is fully navigable at Brownsville, and offers inexpensive barge transportation to Chicago, New Orleans, St. Marks in Florida, Minneapolis, Tulsa, Kansas City, Houston, and Brownsville, Texas, on the border with Mexico. The shipyards of Brownsville, Pennsylvania, provided Captain Richard King of Brownsville, Texas (founder of the King Ranch), with powerful new-built riverboats to navigate the fast currents of the Rio Grande in 1849.

Brownsville is connected to the satellite community of West Brownsville (in Washington County) by the Brownsville Bridge completed in 1914, which spans the Monongahela River. In 1960, the Lane Bane Bridge was constructed just downstream, and path of  U.S. Route 40 was moved to the new high-level structure and new four lane highway by-passing old Route 40 until the two merged in the small bedroom neighborhood known locally as Malden. In the heyday of Conestoga wagon migration travels and with the congestion of Brownsville's hilly terrain, the flat lands about Malden just two-to-three further on offered rare open spaces for west-bound travelers to camp and recuperate from the rigorous mountain descent.
 
Before the highway construction of the late 1950s was completed in the early 60s, two additional branchlike housing concentrations existed, the lined either side of 'California Road' which intersected Old U.S. 40 in the heart of the small business district at landmarks, Paci's Restaurant and Cuppies Drive-In Theatre; the former set in a 17th-century stone Inn. The fourth concentration of housing extended from beside and beyond Cuppies Drive-In for over a mile either side of U.S. 40, now once again, single lane secondary highway. The community has few stores and several housing developments sited along a hilly plateau above the river valleys. The California Area High School is in part sited within parts of Malden.

Notable people

Benjamin W. Arnett (1838–1906), Bishop of A.M.E Church, Civil Rights Activist, Bishop at Wilberforce College in Ohio
John Brashear (1840–1920), astronomer and builder of scientific instruments
Thomas Brown (1738–1797), founder and entrepreneur
Vincent Colaiuta (born 1956 in Brownsville, but lived in Republic), renowned jazz-rock-pop drummer
Richard G. Colbert (February 12, 1915 – December 2, 1973), four-star admiral in the United States Navy and former President of the Naval War College
Doug Dascenzo (born 1964), former MLB outfielder with the Chicago Cubs, Texas Rangers and San Diego Padres
Bill Eadie (born 1947), three-time WWF tag team champion Ax of Demolition
Daniel French (1770–1853), pioneering designer and builder of steam engines
Israel Gregg (1775–1847), first captain of the steamboat Enterprise
Andy Gresh (born 1974) talk show host, television host, color commentator
Alfred Hunt (1817–1888), first president of Bethlehem Iron Company, precursor of Bethlehem Steel Corporation
Esther Hunt (1751–1820), a pioneer who lived on America's frontier as a wife, a mother and a leader in her Quaker faith
Lisa Kirk (1925–1990), singer and actress
Philander C. Knox (1853–1921), lawyer and politician who served as United States Attorney General (1901–1904), a senator from Pennsylvania (1904–1909, 1917–1921) and Secretary of State (1909–1913)
Gary L. Lancaster (1949–2013), United States court judge
Andy Linden (1922–1987), Indy car driver
George Marcus (born 1946), anthropologist
Thomas Novak (born 1952), mining safety engineer
Samuel Shapiro, state treasurer of Maine (1981–1996)
Henry Miller Shreve (1785–1851), pioneering steamboat captain, and steamboat designer
Jacob B. Sweitzer (1821–1881), Civil War Union Army brigade commander
Joe Taffoni (1945–2021), NFL player
Amos Townsend (1821–1895), U.S. congressman
Bill Viola (born 1947), martial arts instructor

Notes

References

Further reading
Brownsville Historical Society (1883). The three towns: a sketch of Brownsville, Bridgeport, and West Brownsville. Brownsville, Pennsylvania: Tru Copy Printing. (1976, second edition; 1993, third edition)
Ellis, Franklin (1882). History of Fayette County, Pennsylvania, with biographical sketches of many of its pioneers and prominent men. Philadelphia: L. H. Everts and Company.

External links

 Brownsville borough official website
 Brownsville Area Revitalization Corporation
 One Year in Brownsville - WQED special

Populated places established in 1785
Pittsburgh metropolitan area
Boroughs in Fayette County, Pennsylvania
Pennsylvania populated places on the Monongahela River
1785 establishments in Pennsylvania